The largescaled mullet is a species of ray-finned fish from the family Mugilidae. It is found in the eastern Atlantic from Mauritania to the Gulf of Guinea. It is the only species in the monospecific genus Parachelon.

References

Mugilidae
Taxobox binomials not recognized by IUCN